Baddyng is a surname. Notable people with the surname include:

John Baddyng (fl. 1382–1401), MP for, and mayor of, Rye, East Sussex, England
Richard Baddyng, MP for Rye also and father of John Baddyng

See also
Badding